The 1949 Portland Pilots football team was an American football team that represented the University of Portland as an independent during the 1949 college football season. The team compiled a 3–5 record. The coaching staff was led by former Notre Dame star Harry "The Horse" Wright in his first year as head coach. Wright was assisted by two other Notre Dame alumni—Neil Green as line coach and Floyd Simmons as backfield coach.

Key players included quarterback Danny Christianson, left halfback John Freeman, right halfback Larry Wissbaum, and end Joe Marshello.

In February 1950, Rev. T. J. Mehling, president of the University of Portland, announced that the school was abandoning its football program in order to focus its efforts on its basketball program. Mehling cited the "extraordinary expenses" associated with maintaining a first-rate football program.

Portland's decision to cease competition in intercollegiate football was part of a trend among west coast Catholic universities in terminating their football programs: Gonzaga (1942); Saint Mary's (1950); Loyola (1951); San Francisco (1951); and Santa Clara (1952).

Schedule

References

Portland
Portland Pilots football seasons
Portland Pilots football
Portland Pilots football